In enzymology, an allene-oxide cyclase is an enzyme that belongs to the family of isomerases, specifically a class of other intramolecular oxidoreductases.  The systematic name of this enzyme class is (9Z)-(13S)-12,13-epoxyoctadeca-9,11,15-trienoate isomerase (cyclizing).

The allene oxide of linolenic acid (i.e., (9Z)-(13S)-12,13-epoxyoctadeca-9,11,15-trienoate) is converted by allene oxide cyclase to jasmonic acid ((15Z)-12-oxophyto-10,15-dienoate).

Structural studies

References 

 

EC 5.3.99
Enzymes of known structure